Elizabeth Leigh Murray (née Elizabeth Harriet Lee, 1815–1892) was an English actor of the Victorian period.

Biography
Elizabeth Leigh Murray, born in 1815, was the daughter of Henry Lee (1765–1836), an actor, playwright and theatre manager, and his second wife Miss Lloyd. As might be expected for a theatrical family of that period, Elizabeth was placed on stage early in life, appearing in Little Pickle when five-years old, and taking roles in many of her father's productions.

She married in 1841 Henry Leigh Murray, an actor.

The Oxford Dictionary of National Biography lists a number of her adult appearance, including:

Cupid, in an extravaganza, Cupid, at the Olympic Theatre, produced by Lucia Elizabeth Vestris 
Love's Labour's Lost, circa 1839, at Covent Garden Theatre
Lady Staunton in The Whistler of the Glen, or, The Fate of the Lily of St Leonards, Edinburgh, billed as Miss E. Lee
Apollo in Diogenes and his Lantern at the Strand Theatre, February 1850
Lady Lavender in The Love Knot at Theatre Royal, Drury Lane, March 1858
Patty in The Chimney Corner, Olympic Theatre, February 1861
Lady Lundie in Man and Wife, based on the Wilkie Collins novel, Man and Wife, Prince of Wales's Theatre, February 1873

Besides these, she appeared in productions across England and Scotland, including joint performances with her husband. She died on 25 May 1892.

References

1815 births
1892 deaths
19th-century English actresses
English stage actresses